Curaçaoans in the Netherlands consist of migrants from Curaçao to the Netherlands and their descendants. Until 2010,  Curaçao and the other Dutch islands in the Caribbean were called the Netherlands Antilles. As of 2014, figures from Statistics Netherlands showed 142,953 people of Dutch Antillean origin in the Netherlands, which the vast majority are from Curaçao.

Notable people 
Patrick van Aanholt, football player
Vurnon Anita, football player
Jandino Asporaat, comedian
Enith Brigitha, swimmer
Izaline Calister, singer
Daisy Dee, singer, actress and TV host
Didi Gregorius, baseball player
Rangelo Janga, football player
Andruw Jones, baseball player
D'Angelo Marshall, kickboxer
Churandy Martina, sprinter
Hensley Meulens, baseball player
Cynthia Ortega, politician
Jordann Pikeur, kickboxer
Wendell Roche, kickboxer
Endy Semeleer, kickboxer  
Sherman Smith (musician)
Jetro Willems, football player
Errol Zimmerman, kickboxer
 Gregory van der Wiel
 Jaron Vicario

References 

Ethnic groups in the Netherlands
Curaçao diaspora